The People's Liberation Army Ground Force (PLAGF) is the land-based service branch of the People's Liberation Army and the largest and oldest branch of the entire Chinese armed forces. The PLAGF can trace its lineage from 1927 as the Chinese Red Army; however, it was not officially established until 1948.

History 

In February 1949, the existing large number of armies and divisions were regularized into up to seventy armies of three divisions each. While some, such as the 1st Army, survived for over fifty years, a number were quickly amalgamated and disestablished in the early 1950s. It appears that twenty per cent or even more of the seventy new armies were disestablished up to 1953; in 1952 alone, the 3rd, 4th, 10th, 17th, 18th, and 19th Armies were disbanded.

The PLA ground forces consist of conventionally armed main and regional units, which in 1987 made up over 70 percent of the PLA. It provided a good conventional defense, but in 1987 had only limited offensive potential and was poorly equipped for nuclear, biological, or chemical warfare. Main forces included about 35 group armies, comprising 118 infantry divisions, 13 armored divisions, and 33 artillery and antiaircraft artillery divisions, plus 71 independent regiments and 21 independent battalions of mostly support troops. Regional forces consisted of 73 divisions of border defense and garrison troops plus 140 independent regiments.

Under the old system, a field army consisted of three partially motorized infantry divisions and two regiments of artillery and anti-aircraft artillery. Each field army division had over 12,000 personnel in three infantry regiments, one artillery regiment, one armored regiment, and one anti-aircraft artillery battalion. Organization was flexible, the higher echelons being free to tailor forces for combat around any number of infantry divisions. At least theoretically, each division had its own armor and artillery — actual equipment levels were not revealed and probably varied — and the assets at the army level and within the independent units could be apportioned as needed.

In 1987 the new, main-force group armies typically included 46,300 soldiers in up to four divisions, believed to include infantry, armor, artillery, air defense, airborne, and air support elements. Although the new group armies were supposed to reflect a move to combined-arms operations, because of a lack of mechanization they continued to consist of infantry supported by armor, artillery, and other units. The 13 armored divisions each had 3 regiments and 240 main battle tanks (MBT) but lacked adequate mechanized infantry support.

There was little evidence of the use of armored personnel carriers during the Sino-Vietnamese border conflict in 1979, and tanks were used as mobile artillery and as support for dismounted infantry. Artillery forces emphasized towed guns, howitzers, and truck-mounted multiple rocket launchers. In the 1980s some self-propelled artillery entered service, but the PLA also produced rocket launchers as a cheaper but not totally effective alternative to self-propelled guns. There was a variety of construction equipment, mobile bridging, trucks, and prime movers. A new multiple rocket launcher for scattering antitank mines appeared in 1979, but mine-laying and mine-clearing equipment remained scarce.

Regional forces consisted of full-time PLA troops organized as independent divisions for garrison missions. Garrison divisions were static, artillery-heavy units deployed along the coastline and borders in areas of likely attack. Regional forces were armed less heavily than their main-force counterparts, and they were involved in training the militia. They were the PLA units commonly used to restore order during the Cultural Revolution. When chairman Mao proclaimed the People's Republic of China on October 1, 1949, the PLAGF was a 4.9 million-strong peasant army. After some time, the demobilization of ill-trained and politically unreliable troops began, resulting in the reduction of army strength.

In the 21st century, the PLA Ground Forces are continuing to undergo significant reform, experimentation, modernization, and restructuring to deal with potential threats and enhance their capabilities. Divisions are downsized into combined arms brigades, which reorganized into high-readiness army groups. The division echelon is phased out with only a limited number of division structures remaining existent. While the size of the PLA Ground Force has been reduced over the past few decades, technology-intensive elements such as special operations forces (SOF), army aviation (helicopters), surface-to-air missiles (SAMs), and electronic warfare units have all been rapidly expanded.

The latest operational doctrine of the PLA ground forces highlights the importance of information technology, electronic and information warfare, and long-range precision strikes in future warfare. The older generation telephone/radio-based command, control, and communications (C3) systems are being replaced by integrated battlefield information networks featuring local/wide-area networks (LAN/WAN), satellite communications, unmanned aerial vehicle (UAV)-based surveillance and reconnaissance systems, and mobile command and control centers.

Structure

Organizations 
The People's Liberation Army Ground Force (PLAGF) operates under the command authority of the Central Military Commission through theater commands (TC). The People's Liberation Army (PLA) theater commands are joint operation commands that hold extensive control over the PLA Ground Force, the Navy, the Air Force, the Rocket Force, and the Strategic Support Force. Theater commands are defence-orientated tactical, political, and bureaucratic organizations entrusted to operate in different geographic areas of China. They are responsible for developing strategies, tactics, and policies specific to their respective areas, and they are directly in charge of responding to security threats within their assigned regions. Under each theater command, the Army theater headquarters are responsible for the tactical operations inside the theater and are capable of conducting joint operations with support from other service branches. In parallel to the theater commands, the PLAGF General Staff Department, the headquarter of the Army, holds the dual chain of commands to its units in peacetime, managing administrative tasks and duties. In wartime, it's likely that theater commands will hold the exclusive—command authority over the Army components.

Under the theater commands, each provincial-level government has a correspondent military district (MD) with the same dual chain of command structure as the theater command system. Military district army headquarters are military organs primarily responsible for provincial conscription and demobilization assignments, command of local Militia troops, and command of certain border defense units. Under the military districts are local commands, which provide the lowest level of military service including meeting recruitment quotas, veteran service, border security checks, and national defense education in their respective county, city, and municipal administrative regions. Aside from the standardized command structure, several military district units are directly subordinated to the Army headquarters, usually in areas PLAGF leaderships deemed sensitive, including Beijing, Hong Kong, and Xinjiang.

The predecessor to the theater command, the military region, was replaced by the current structure after the 2015 reform.

Branches of service 
The People's Liberation Army Ground Force has standing regular army and reserve force. Although conscription is employed in China by law, mandatory military service has not been implemented since 1949 as the People's Liberation Army has been able to recruit sufficient numbers voluntarily. Chinese militia is not a component of the People's Liberation Army, however, they could provide a certain degree of reserve function, which was indicated by "Militia Military Training and Evaluation Outline" released by the People's Liberation Army General Staff Department in 2007.

PLAGF branches of service are composed of infantry (including mechanized infantry), tank, artillery, air defense, aviation, military engineering, anti-chemical (nuclear, biological and chemical defense), communications, special operation, logistics, reconnaissance, electronic warfare, etc. These branches of service have their respective military education institutions.

Operational structure 
PLA operational structure reflects China's strategic missions, political environment, and geographical circumstances. There are 13 corps sized group armies (also known as combined corps) since the end of April 2017, divided among five Theater commands — Eastern, Southern, Northern, Western and Central. Within the group armies, the old divisions are being downsized into brigades. Each group army includes six maneuver combined arms brigades, fire support/artillery brigades, air defense brigades, aviation brigades, special operations brigades, combat support brigades, and sustainment brigades.

The maneuver combat components of the group armies are combined arms brigades, including a mix of heavy combined arms brigades, medium combined arms brigades, light combined arms brigade, amphibious combined arms brigades, and mountain combined arms brigades. The practice is functionally similar to the US Army brigade combat team concept with unique modifications influenced by China's terrain diversity, strategic priority, political system, and military history.

The PLA heavy, medium, and light combined arms brigades share a modular construct, resembling its superior and subordinate units at the corps and battalion level. A typical PLAGF combined arms brigade has the brigade HQ, four maneuver combat battalions, and other support battalions. For instance, a heavy combined arms brigade includes four combined arms battalions, one artillery battalion, one air defense battalion, one reconnaissance battalion, one combat support battalion, and one sustainment battalion.

Combined arms battalions apply a structure drawn from the brigade echelon. For example, heavy combined arms battalions consist of battalions HQ company (including subordinate medic, reconnaissance, and air defense platoons), four maneuver combat companies including two tank companies (14 tanks per company), and two mechanized infantry companies (14 vehicles per company), one firepower company, and one combat support/sustainment company.

Before the 2015 reform, the International Institute for Strategic Studies (IISS) attributes the PLA Ground Force with nine active armored divisions consisting of a number of armored brigades, 25 infantry divisions (mechanized or motorized), organized into a number of infantry brigades, and 8 artillery divisions, also organized into field artillery brigades. Dennis Blasko wrote in 2000 that the traditional structure of PLA divisions (armored and mechanized) consisted roughly of three regiments – tuan – of the main service arm, each of three battalions plus support units, a fourth regiment/brigade of infantry (in an armored division) or armor (in an infantry division), a field artillery regiment, an anti-aircraft defense regiment or battalion, and signals, engineer, reconnaissance, and chemical defense battalions or companies, plus combat service support units.

Special operations forces 

The PLA first became interested in modern special warfare in the mid-1980s when it was shifting from the "People's War" to "active defense." After the reform, PLA special operations forces are organized under the combined corps level, as special operations brigades. Special operation brigades provide organic deep reconnaissance and commando operation capability to the combined arms maneuver operations of their respective group armies, and they are highly specialized to operate in their specific theater. Different from Western-style special operations forces, PLAGF special operations brigades focus on operating in conventional military environments with missions focusing on reconnaissance, target acquisition, sabotage, raids, and search and rescue. The unconventional warfare, counterterrorism, foreign internal defense, civil
affairs, and internal security capability in China are covered by People's Armed Police (PAP) special operations units, instead of the military.

Personnel

Commissioned officers 
The current system of officer ranks and insignia is established in 1988. There are several paths to becoming a commissioned officer, such as joining a military academy, attending reserve officer program, or cadre selection program.

Officers may use Comrade to formally address another member of the military ("comrade" plus rank or position, as in "comrade Colonel", "comrade battalion leader", or simply "comrade(s)" when lacking information about the person's rank, or talking to several service people.)

Enlisted personnel 
The current system of other ranks and insignia dates from 2009. Sergeant and Corporal are referred to as non-commissioned officers. New recruits have no military ranks before the boot camp is completed, and they will be awarded the rank of private after they have graduated from the induction training. According to Article 16 of Chapter 3 of the "Regulations on the Service of Active Soldiers of the Chinese People's Liberation Army", "The lowest enlisted rank is Private".

Conscripts can be promoted to privates first class in their second year. At the end of two years, conscripts may retire or become NCOs if they volunteer, though the position requires at least high school diploma, specialized skills, or undertaking training courses. They can also attend a military academy to become officers after evaluations.

In 2014, the position of unit "master chief" or "sergeant major" is established to award experienced NCOs that can assist platoon, company, battalion, and higher commands in leadership and training responsibilities.

Soldiers may use Comrade to formally address another member of the military ("comrade" plus rank or position, as in "comrade Sergeant", "comrade squad leader", or simply "comrade(s)" when lacking information about the person's rank, or talking to several service people.)

Equipment

Heavy equipment

The PLA Ground Force is heavily mechanized with armored platforms, advanced electronic warfare capability, concentrated firepower, and modern weapon systems that are competitive against Western counterparts. The PLA ground force is divided into highly mechanized heavy, medium, and light combined arms units. Heavy combined arms brigades are armored with main battle tanks and tracked infantry fighting vehicles, medium combined arms brigades are armed with tracked or wheeled infantry fighting vehicles, and light combined arms brigades are mobilized with armored personal carriers, MRAP trucks, or armored cars.

At combined corps level, the PLAGF employs combined arms brigades, heavy artillery systems, medium-range air defense systems, special forces, army aviation units, and various engineering, and electronic warfare support systems. Weapon systems at this level include PLZ-05 howitzer, PCL-181 howitzer, PHL-03/16 multiple rocket launcher, and HQ-16 air defense system. Air assets within the aviation brigade include Z-10 attack helicopter, Z-19 recon helicopter, and Z-20 utility helicopter, etc. Unmanned aerial systems are employed extensively in PLA formations of all types. At combined arms brigade level, brigade HQ can deploy various combined arms battalions composited with tanks, assault guns, and infantry fight vehicles (IFV) such as the ZTZ-99A tank, the ZBD-04A IFV, the ZBL-08 IFV, the ZTL-11 assault gun, and the CSK-181 MRAP fast-attack vehicle. Fire support, reconnaissance, and air defense battalion are equipped with self-propelled artilleries, rocket launchers, missile carriers, unmanned aerial vehicles, and air defense systems such as PLZ-07, PLL-09, PCL-161/171, PHL-11, PHZ-11, PGZ-09/95, PGL-12/AA, HQ-17/A, and AFT-9/10.

At battalion level, battalion HQ can direct tank company, assault gun company, mechanized infantry company, and firepower company to provide rapid close-combat maneuver, with support assets including the PCP-001 rapid-firing mortar, PLL-05/PLZ-10 self-propelled gun-mortar, AFT-8 missile carrier, MANPADS, and crew-served weapon systems such as QJG-85 heavy machine gun, PP-87 or newer PBP-172 mortar, QLZ-04 automatic grenade launcher, and HJ-8E wire-guided missile. 

Under each mechanized infantry company are standard infantry platoons and a firepower platoon, which is equipped with lightweight mortar, anti-material rifle, 35 mm automatic grenade launcher, various rocket launcher, and heavy machine gun. At platoon level, a mechanized infantry squad consists of nine infantrymen, in which seven members are dismounted during combat. Infantry squads vary in composition based on the type of combined arms battalions. Medium and light infantry squads equip reusable rocket launchers to improve anti-armor and anti-fortification capability, whereas heavy infantry squads have no squad-level rockets, instead relying upon fire support from the firepower platoon, or their own ZBD-04A infantry fighting vehicle.

Weapons

Individual and crew-served weapons
The standard issue rifle of PLA infantrymen is QBZ-95/191 chambered in proprietary 5.8×42mm, and the sidearm is QSZ-92 chambered in 5.8×21mm DAP92. Vehicle crews are equipped with QBZ-95B short-barreled carbine. The QCW-05 is a 5.8 mm submachine gun used by special forces and non-combat personnel. Sharpshooting is provided by the QBU-88/191 marksman rifle and QBU-141/202 sniper rifle. Indirect fire is provided by the QLG-10 grenade launcher. QBS-09 combat shotgun is issued for door breaching and close-quarters battle. The QJB-95 serves as the squad automatic weapon with its 75-round drum magazine.

PF-89, PF-97, and DZJ-08 disposable rocket launchers could be distributed on an ad hoc basis to infantry squads for direct-fire applications. Specialized fire support weapons, often equipped with dedicated rocketeers, or members of the firepower platoons, include the HJ-12 anti-tank guided missile, PF-98 rocket launcher, the QLZ-87 and QLZ-04 35 mm automatic grenade launcher, the QBU-10 anti-material rifle, QLU-11 sniper grenade launcher, QJG-02 anti-air machine gun, QJZ-89 heavy machine gun, and the PP-89/93 60 mm mortar.

Infantry equipment and uniforms

In 2014, the cost to equip a single Chinese soldier is about 9,400 yuan (US$1,523). The standard kit includes Type 07 camouflage uniforms, helmet, tactical vest, gas mask, backpack, first-aid kit, infantry weapons, woven belt, rain cap, camouflaged uniform, kettle, and combat boots. However, regular infantrymen rarely use the issued body armor stored in the armory. Prior to 2015, only special operation detachment and soldiers in the active mission were equipped with body armor.

The infantry equipment such as heavy body armor, personal radio, and knee pads has been seen in the standard kit in 2015 when PLA are deployed into high-risk areas, as observed for units participating in UN Peacekeeping and counter-piracy operations. The PLA has started to procure body armors for soldiers on large scale since March 2020, with 1.4 million body armor on order, which includes 930,000 units of plates for universal bulletproof vests and 467,000 units of plates for an enhanced bulletproof vest.

The Type 19 uniform with new xingkong digital camouflage patterns, tactical vest, backpack, protective gear, and eyewear started to replace Type 07 uniform series since 2019. Along with the uniform, a new communication system, personal computer, tactical interface, and assault rifle family QBZ-191, new variants of the QSZ-92 pistol family, along with whole new sets of weapon systems are also being adopted by the PLAGF since 2019. These new upgrades are components of the new Integrated Soldier Combat System, a program aiming to overhaul the PLA's infantry equipment.

Transformation
In 1987 the PLA ground forces, which relied upon obsolescent but serviceable equipment, were most anxious to improve defenses against armored vehicles and aircraft. Most equipments was produced from Soviet designs of the 1950s, but weapons were being incrementally upgraded, some with Western technology. One example of upgraded, Soviet-design equipment was the Type 69 MBT, an improved version of the Type 59 MBT, itself based on the Soviet T-54. The Type 69 had improved armor, a gun stabilizer, a fire control system including a laser rangefinder, infrared searchlights, and a 105 mm smooth-bore gun.

In 1987 the existence of a new, Type 80 MBT was revealed in the Western press. The tank had a new chassis, a 105 mm gun, and a fire control system. The PLA was believed to have atomic demolition munitions, and there were unconfirmed reports that it also had tactical nuclear weapons. In any case, nuclear bombs and missiles in the Chinese inventory could be used in a theater role.

The PLA had a scarcity of antitank guided missiles, tactical surface-to-air missiles, and electronics to improve communications, fire control, and sensors. China began production of the Soviet Sagger antitank missile in 1979 but lacked a more powerful, longer range, semiautomatic antitank guided missile. The PLA required a mobile surface-to-air missile and an infantry shoulder-fired missile for use against helicopters and certain other aircraft.

The PLA Ground Forces continue to undergo significant modernization and re-structuring to deal with potential threats and enhance their capabilities. Front line troops such as special forces, marines and paratroopers are given priority in receiving modern weapon systems and equipment. Other areas of improvement are its battlefield C4ISR capabilities, with the introduction of satellite communications, wireless networks, and digital radios, army commanders are now able to maintain constant communications with their front-line units while on the move. The bulk of the ground forces have been regularly asked to operate under severe electronic countermeasures conditions in exercises. Also a network-centric warfare capability connecting different combat, intelligence, surveillance and reconnaissance elements to form an integrated network is being developed.

Equipment Summary
The PLAGF inventory maintains an array of military vehicles. All figures below are provided by the International Institute for Strategic Studies. Auxiliary vehicles such as engineering vehicles, logistics vehicles, reconnaissance vehicles, as well as antiquated and reserved equipment are not included.

Relationship with other organizations 

The People's Liberation Army Ground Force maintains close relationships with several paramilitary organizations within China, primarily the People's Armed Police (PAP) and the Militia (also known as the China Militia). Both of these paramilitary organisations act as a reserve force for the PLAGF during a time of national emergency such as war or natural disaster. The PAP consists of approximately 1.5 million personnel. Their primary mission during peacetime is internal security and counter-terrorism.

The Militia is a mass force engaged in daily production under the leadership of the Chinese Communist Party (CCP), and forms part of the Chinese armed forces. Under the command of the military organs, it undertakes such jobs as war preparation services, security and defense operation tasks and assistance in maintaining social order and public security. The Militia numbers some 3 million service men and women.

See also 
 Ranks of the People's Liberation Army Ground Force
 People's Armed Police
 Militia (China)
 Republic of China (Taiwan) Army

References

Notes

Citations

Bibliography 

 Sinodefence.com – Chinese military information website
 Global Defence Forum
 

 
1